Secret Cinema is  a London-based entertainment company that specialises in immersive film and television events. Founded and created in 2007 by Fabien Riggall, it began with mystery screenings at initially undisclosed venues in London, including interactive performances in purpose-built sets. With over 70 productions to date, the events have grown to large-scale experiences where up to 5,000 people per night spend 5 hours exploring the worlds, engaging with characters, and becoming part of the story.

As screenings grew in size and popularity, Secret Cinema began to release the title to its audience beforehand in order allow them to be more engaged with the narrative during the event.

Events 
In December 2011, Secret Cinema held a one-off screening of The Third Man in Kabul to coincide with its London run of the film. The film was screened in both Kabul and London simultaneously.

In between 2011 and 2014, Secret Cinema held screenings of Prometheus, Grease and The Shawshank Redemption.

In July 2014, the company launched Back to the Future screenings, set in a life-size recreation of the 1950s Hill Valley town featured in Robert Zemeckis's film. The first two Back to the Future dates were cancelled with only a few hours' notice and the company offered a full refund or exchange for the cost of tickets, but not for any booking fees; the opening dates of its 2013 production of Brazil had also been cancelled at short notice.

In December 2014, Secret Cinema announced the screening of a secret film in response to Sony's withdrawal from the release of The Interview. The screening was revealed to be Charlie Chaplin's The Great Dictator, which was simultaneously screened in Rome, London, New York, Los Angeles and San Francisco, in support of Article 19, a charity dedicated to the freedom of speech. Screenings included live speeches and readings, music and performances. In March 2015, the company and its founder were criticised on Twitter and other publications for using unpaid actors; the company defended its practice and described the volunteers as interns who benefited from the experience.

In June 2015, Secret Cinema launched Star Wars: Empire Strikes Back, its biggest production to date. As part of the hundred shows that ran in London, a side-event at Alexandra Palace with musical guests DJ Yoda, Nightmares on Wax and Jamie Jones raised £11,000 for the Refugee Council. A further £29,000 was raised for the charity from the show. The production made it to the top ten UK box office for eleven weeks, generating a total of £6.45 million.

In September 2015, the company announced it would raise funds to bring free movie screenings to Syrian refugees in Europe, starting with the camp in Pas-de-Calais, France.

In April 2017, Secret Cinema ran an extended production of Baz Luhrmann's Moulin Rouge! Artists such as Jarvis Cocker and Groove Armada performed for audiences. Over 70,000 people attended, putting Moulin Rouge! into the UK box-office top ten for eleven weeks.

Subsequent productions have included Blade Runner, Romeo + Juliet, Casino Royale and Stranger Things.

In early 2020 Secret Cinema made a deal with Disney and Patwardhan Investments Ltd.

In May 2020, Secret Cinema moved its 2020 Dirty Dancing summer programme of immersive screenings to 2021, due to the COVID-19 pandemic. The company had proposed using the Low Hall sports ground in Walthamstow for the 3–month Dirty Dancing event. Local residents voiced concerns about COVID-19 transmission, noise pollution, the proximity of nature reserves, the cost of tickets, and the loss of the playing field to residents.

The Independent describes Secret Cinema's predominant problem to be its entry cost, going up to £75 for large scale production such as The Empire Strikes Back. Riggall counters that his productions are comparable to West End theatre shows, rather than any other cinema in London, and therefore so is the ticket price.

On November 21, 2021, Netflix and Riot Games partnered with Secret Cinema to bring players directly into the world of Arcane (a Netflix series) with an in-person experience in Los Angeles, California. The experience was "equipped with bespoke backstories and missions, the line between actors and audience is truly blurred as players explore the dark and dangerous underworld and encounter its inhabitants—the strange, the sinister and sometimes even the friendly".

Community work 
Each Secret Cinema production employs hundreds of staff during the months of design, build, rehearsal and operations in all disciplines. They employ locally where possible, including individuals and organisations. The cast usually includes over 50 artists per show and many more make up the workforce behind the scenes including everything from plumbers to set designers, illusionists to videographers, chefs, makeup artists, composers, animators, bartenders, security, dancers, web developers and sound technicians. Secret Cinema pay a minimum of London living wage or equity rates, where appropriate.

Instead of opening a permanent venue, Secret Cinema has rescued and revitalised abandoned and derelict spaces for the past 13 years. They spend hundreds of thousands of pounds turning unusual spaces into venues, giving it a second life.

Together with local schools and colleges Secret Cinema work to enhance talent and encourage the Arts as a career avenue for young people, including back to work schemes and local borough initiatives. Over the course of the last five years they have delivered dozens of free schools workshops, site tours, filmmaking courses and specially adapted student shows.

Charity work 
As part of an ongoing commitment to support the vital work of charities, one is selected as a partner for each production based on the theme of the film. Through various initiatives and audience donations, the Secret Cinema charity programme has raised over £130,000 since 2015.

In August 2014, they held a charity screening of Dead Poets Society, to mark the death of actor Robin Williams. All proceeds were donated to the mental health charity Mind. Each Secret Cinema production raises money for charities including Save the Children; the National Alliance on Mental Illness; Refugee Council; and MAC UK, a local Camden charity which provides mental health services to disadvantaged youth.

References

External links
Official site

Entertainment companies of the United Kingdom
Film organisations in the United Kingdom
Cinemas in the United Kingdom